Kirsty Wade (née McDermott, born 6 August 1962) is a British former middle-distance runner. She is a three-time Commonwealth Games gold medallist representing Wales, winning the 800 metres in Brisbane 1982 and both the 800 metres and 1500 metres in Edinburgh 1986. She represented Great Britain at the 1988 Olympic Games and the 1992 Olympic Games. She is also a former British record holder in the 800m and the mile.

Early life
Wade was born in Girvan, Scotland, moved to Llandrindod Wells, Wales aged three and attended school there.

Athletics career
She trained in the Elan Valley and joined Brecon Athletic Club as an 11-year-old. As Kirsty McDermott, she won the 1976 AAAs National Under 15 800m title in 2:11.10 and the 1977 AAAs U17 title in 2:07.74. In 1979, she finished sixth at the European Junior Championships in Poland, running 2:04.72. She first came to senior prominence in 1982, when she won the Commonwealth Games 800 metres title in Brisbane, representing Wales, winning in 2:01.31, just ahead of Scotland's Anne Clarkson (later Purvis), who ran 2:01.52.

After a disappointing 1984, when she failed to qualify for the Olympics, she made a major advance in 1985. At 800 metres, she improved her three-year-old PB of 2:00.56, to set a UK record of 1:57.42, breaking Christina Boxer's six-year-old mark of 1:59.05. This made her the third British woman, after Boxer and Shireen Bailey, to run sub 2:00 minutes for 800 metres. The record stood for ten years. She also broke the UK record for the mile with 4:19.41 in Oslo. This made her only the fourth woman in history to run a sub 4:20-mile, after Mary Decker, Maricica Puica and Natalya Artyomova. The record stood for only a month, as Zola Budd ran 4:17.57 in Zurich. American magazine Track & Field News ranked her in the top 10 on their world merit rankings, at both 800 metres (8) and 1500 m/mile (9).

In 1986, now competing as Kirsty Wade and living in the north-east of England (she became a member of Blaydon Harriers Athletic Club), she became the first woman to achieve the 800m/1500m double at the Commonwealth Games, when she won in Edinburgh. She won the 800 metres in 2:00.94, ahead of England's Diane Edwards and Lorraine Baker. In the 1500m, she defeated the Canadian pair, Debbie Bowker and Lynn Williams in 4:10.91. Later that year at the European Championships in Stuttgart, she finished seventh in the 1500 metres final in 4:04.99. In the Track & Field News world merit rankings, she ranked number 5 in the 1500/mile top ten.

In June 1987, Wade scored one of her biggest career wins, when she won the European Cup 1500 metres in Prague, defeating future World and Olympic champion Tatyana Samolenko. In July, she ran her lifetime best for the 1500 m with 4:00.73 in Gateshead. In August, she ran her 3000 metres best of 8:47.70, to become only the second British woman, after Christina Boxer, to have run sub two-minutes for the 800 metres and sub nine-minutes for the 3000 metres (the feat has since been achieved by Hannah England, Jessica Judd and Laura Muir). In September, in the 1500m final at the World Championships in Rome (won by Samolenko), she was sixth in 4:01.41. She originally finished seventh but was promoted after the disqualification of Sandra Gasser. For the third consecutive year, she ranked in the top ten at 1500/mile, in the Track & Field News merit rankings, at number 6.

At the 1988 AAA Championships in Birmingham, incorporating the British Olympic trials, Wade won the 800 m and was third in the 1500 m, earning selection for both events. At the Olympic Games in Seoul, she reached the semi-finals of the 800 metres, running 2:00.86, while in the 1500 metres, she ran a disappointing 4:08.37 in the heats, failing to reach the final.

Wade's next major competition was the 1991 World Championships in Tokyo, having missed the 1990 season through pregnancy. In Tokyo, she finished sixth in the 1500 metres final in 4:05.16. She qualified for her second Olympic Games in 1992. In Barcelona, she ran 4:08.30, to reach the semi-finals of the 1500 metres, where she was eliminated in 4:11.36.

She is the current Welsh record holder for the 800 metres and the Mile. Her 1500 metres record being broken by Hayley Tullet in 2003. As of 2021, on the UK all-time lists, Wade ranks fifth at 800 metres, third at 1000 metres, tenth at 1500 metres and fifth at the Mile.

Later career
Wade became an Olympic Torchbearer for the 2012 London Olympics, carrying the torch through Stornoway on the Isle of Lewis on the morning of 11 May 2012. Wade was nominated for her community sports development work on the Isle of Lewis, where she lives with her husband and their children.

Personal bests
800 m – 1:57.42 (24 June 1985 Belfast, UK record 1985–1995)
1000 m – 2:33.70 (9 August 1985 Gateshead, UK record 1985–1995)
1500 m – 4:00.73 (26 July 1987 Gateshead)
1 mile – 4:19.41 (27 July 1985 Oslo, UK record July 1985 – August 1985)
3000 m – 8:47.7 (5 August 1987 Gateshead)

International competitions

National titles
AAA Championships 800 metres (1988)
AAA Indoor Championships 800 metres (1981, 1985, 1986, 1994)
AAA Indoor Championships 1500 metres (1987)

References

1962 births
Living people
Welsh female middle-distance runners
Athletes (track and field) at the 1988 Summer Olympics
Athletes (track and field) at the 1992 Summer Olympics
Commonwealth Games gold medallists for Wales
Commonwealth Games medallists in athletics
Olympic athletes of Great Britain
People from Girvan
Athletes (track and field) at the 1982 Commonwealth Games
Athletes (track and field) at the 1986 Commonwealth Games
People from Llandrindod Wells
Sportspeople from Powys
World Athletics Championships athletes for Great Britain
Sportspeople from South Ayrshire
Medallists at the 1982 Commonwealth Games
Medallists at the 1986 Commonwealth Games